Custodio de señoras ( Custodian of ladies) is a 1979 Argentine comedy film directed by Hugo Sofovich.

Cast
Jorge Porcel	 ... 	Jorge
Graciela Alfano
Javier Portales

Supporting
Anita Almada
Raquel María Alvarez
Cacho Bustamante
Osvaldo Castro
Remedios Climent
Roberto Dairiens
Horacio Dener
Coco Fossati
Hellen Grant
Lalo Hartich
Alberto Irizar
Miguel Jordán
Maurice Jouvet
Mónica Lander
Augusto Larreta
Alberto Olmedo
Raúl Ricutti
Carlos Rotundo
Gloria Ugarte
Emilio Vidal

External links
 

1979 films
1970s Spanish-language films
1970s sex comedy films
Argentine sex comedy films
Films directed by Hugo Sofovich
1979 comedy films
1970s Argentine films